Deborah Jones may refer to:

Deborah Jones (artist), see Forever Friends (brand)
Deborah Jones (photographer), see James Beard Foundation Award
Deborah Jones, candidate in Sefton Central (UK Parliament constituency)
Deborah Jones, screenwriter of When Innocence Is Lost
Deborah Jones, on List of Degrassi characters
Deborah K. Jones, American diplomat

See also
Debbie Jones (disambiguation)
Deborah Barnes-Jones, British diplomat